Saint Anselm's may refer to:

Places
Challand-Saint-Anselme, Italy
Saint-Anselme, Quebec, Canada
Saint-Anselme Aerodrome, Quebec
Saint-Anselme, New Brunswick, Canada
San Anselmo, California, United States

Education
 The Pontifical Atheneum of St. Anselm (Pontificio Ateneo Sant Anselmo) in Rome
 Saint Anselm College, a liberal arts college in Goffstown, New Hampshire, United States
 St. Anselm's College, a grammar school in Merseyside, England
 St. Anselm's Abbey School, a Catholic preparatory school in Washington, D.C., United States
 St. Anselm Catholic School, an elementary school in Toronto, Canada
 St. Anselm's Catholic School, a Catholic secondary school in Kent, England
 St. Anselm Hall, the University of Manchester, UK
 St. Anselm's Senior Secondary School, Ajmer, a Catholic school with church in Ajmer, Rajasthan, India
 St. Anselm's Pink City Sr. Sec. School, Jaipur, a Catholic school with church in Rajasthan, India
 St Anselm's School, Bakewell, an independent school in Derbyshire, England

Religion
 Saint Anselm Abbey (New Hampshire), in Goffstown, New Hampshire, United States
 Saint Anselm's Abbey (Washington, D.C.), United States
 St. Anselm's art, an archaic superstition
 St Anselm's ontological argument, an ontological argument for the existence of God attempting an a priori proof using intuition and reason alone

See also
Anselm (disambiguation)
St. Anselm's Church (disambiguation)
Church of Sant'Anselmo all'Aventino, Rome
Universidad San Anselmo de Canterbury